Potic Mountain is a mountain in Greene County, New York. It is located in the Catskill Mountains west of Limestreet. Indian Ridge is located west, and Flint Mine Hill is located east of Potic Mountain.

References

Mountains of Greene County, New York
Mountains of New York (state)